Isenberg was a County of medieval Germany. It was a partition of the county of Altena and was annexed to Limburg(Lenne) in 1242.

Counts of Isenberg (1191–1242)
 Eberhard I, Count of Berg-Altena (1140–1180) count of Altena of the burg Altena on the river Lenne.
 Arnold of Altena (1180–1209) count of Altena-Isenberg of the burg Isenberg on the river Lenne.
 Frederick of Isenberg (1209–1226) count of Altena-Isenberg of the burg Isenberg on the river Ruhr.
 Dietrich I of Isenberg (1226–1301) count of Limburg of the Hohenlimburg on the river Lenne.

References

Sources 
 R. Gerstner, Geschichte der Lothringischen Pfalzgrafschaft, Seite 14f.Nonn,Pagus,Anm.290; H.R.I.Nr.76, S.174 v.15.4.958/59: Erenfridus comes in comitatu Hoyensi (Huy); ebd.Nr.77, S.175, v.8.5.959; D.O.I 89v. 4.5.947: in pago Hatteri (Hatuarien) zwischen Rhein und Maas in comitatu Erenfridi; s. a. D.O.I 316 v.17.1.966; Lac. IV.Nr.604a,945:in Pago bunnensi in comitatu Erenfridi comitis; VK II, S.248:in Pago Tulpiacense in comitatu Erenfridi comitis; belegt 941-966 mit  Zülpichgau, Bonngau, Hattuariengau, Eifelgau, Ruhrgau, Keldachgau 
 Melchers, B. Die altesten Grafen von Berg bis zu ihrem Aussterben 1225. Zeitschrift des bergischen Geschichtsvereins, Jahrgang 7, diss. Marburg, 1911
 Kraus, Thomas R. Die Entstehung der Landesherrschaft der Grafen von Berg bis zum Jahre 1225, Neustadt an der Aisch 1981
 Andernach, Norbert, Entwicklung der Grafschaft Berg, in: Land im Mitelpunkt der Mächte. Die Herzogtümer Jülich-Kleve-Berg, Kleve 1984,S. 63–73.
 Holdt, Ulrike, Die Entwicklung des Territoriums Berg (Karte und Beiheft V/16 = Geschichtlicher Atlas der Rheinlande, Lieferung 11), Bonn 2008.
 Bibliothek Nationale (Paris) msfr.5230. L'armorial Bellenville of Armorial Beaulaincourt
 Aders,G. Die Grafen (von Limburg) und die Herrn von Limburg-Styrum aus dem Haus Berg-Altena-Isenberg. Zeitschift Der Marker 1956 blad 7.
 Quadflieg, Eberhard LXXVIII Table 5. Die grafen von Altena, Isenberg und Limburg
 Berg,A. Archive fur Sippenforschung Heft 14. Jahrgang 30. Mai 1964
 Van Limburg, H. Graven van Limburg Hohenlimburg & Broich. 2016
 Eversberg, H. Graf Friederich von Isenberg und die Isenburg 1193-1226. Hattingen 1989
 Bleicher, W. Hohenlimburgher Heimatblätter fűr den Raum Hagen und Isenlohn. Beiträge zur Landeskunde. Monatsschrift des Vereins fűr Orts- und Heimatkunde Hohenlimburg e.V. Drűck Geldsetzer und Schäfer Gmbh. Iserlohn 1993-2013

Counties of the Holy Roman Empire

Counts of Limburg